Walnut Street station may refer to:

Walnut Street station (SEPTA), a SEPTA trolley station in Upper Darby, Pennsylvania
Walnut–Locust station, a SEPTA subway station in Philadelphia, Pennsylvania
Walnut Street (NJT station), an NJ Transit station in Montclair, New Jersey

See also
Walnut Street (disambiguation)